Lampaul-Guimiliau is a commune in the Finistère department and administrative region of Brittany in north-western France. It is noted for its parish close.

Etymology

The place name element lan or lam (llan in Welsh) originally signified an enclosure, particularly a sacred enclosure, and later came to mean a church. The name Lampaul therefore means church or enclosure dedicated to St Paulinus. St Pol (Paol, Paul, or Paulinus) was one of the seven founder saints of Brittany, a 6th-century Welsh missionary closely associated with the Léon diocese of Brittany, in which Lampaul-Guimiliau is situated. Parish closes are a distinctive feature of this diocese, although they are not entirely confined to it.

In the Middle Ages, the village was part of the parish of Guimiliau. This means township of Miliau, a Breton saint of the 6th or 9th century. Later, rising prosperity and economic growth brought separate status, with a separate parish church. Hence the name in full means St Pol's Church in the Settlement of St Miliau.

Sights

Parish close

Parish closes are a distinctive feature of the Breton culture of the Léon region. The close is so-called because it is a church yard entirely enclosed by a wall, with a ceremonial entrance arch. The closes of the Léon diocese date from the 16th and early 17th centuries, when the area was at the peak of its prosperity, founded on the hemp industry and on Channel and Atlantic trade.

The parish close of Lampaul-Guimiliau commands the road junction at the centre of the village. It is one of the best examples of its kind. It contains not only the church and graveyard of the parish, but also a large and elaborate calvary or crucifix and a noted charnel house, both common features of Breton closes, and a vast belfry. The church and charnel house display a large body of polychrome sculpture, mainly of 16th or 17th century date and rich in complex Christian iconography, reflecting the preoccupations of the Counter-Reformation or Catholic Reformation.

Belfry

The belfry or bell tower, constructed from 1573, was originally one of the highest in Finistère. However it was truncated by fire following a lightning strike in 1809.

Charnel house
The charnel house or ossuary dates from 1667 and was designed by the architect Guillaume Kerlezroux. it is dominated by a retable portraying the Risen Christ. Formerly it also housed a notable tableau of the Entombment of Christ, which has now been moved into the church itself.

Polychrome interior
The interior of the church is replete with polychrome sculpture and decoration. Dominating the nave is a 16th-century rood screen, showing the crucified Christ, attended by the Virgin Mary and St John the Apostle. Below this, scenes of the Passion are represented in rich detail.

A number of complex retables focus on the Passion and on the lives and deeds of saints, including John the Baptist, St Margaret the Virgin, and St Lawrence. Each is divided into numerous panels, with episodes modelled in relief, and each is flanked by free-standing statuary. There are also a number of important separate free-standing pieces, including an oak Descent from the Cross, the Entombment, and St Pol.

The baptistery is one of the most striking among the parish closes. It is an octagonal Baroque concoction, dating from about 1650. Unlike most of its kind, it is elaborately polychrome, with highly-elaborate pillars and finely-modelled representation of the baptism of Christ.

The church also displays its banners. These are an important artifact of Breton culture. They form a rallying point for parishioners attending the local pilgrimage festivals, known as pardons.

Gallery

Population
In French the inhabitants of Lampaul-Guimiliau are known as Lampaulais.

See also
Communes of the Finistère department
Roland Doré sculptor

References

Further reading
Yannick Pelletier, Lampaul-Guimiliau, Editions Jean-Paul Gisserot, 2005. 
A guide to the church, in French, with an introduction to the cultural and historical background to parish closes.

External links

Mayors of Finistère Association 

Communes of Finistère